Kėboniai (formerly) is a village in Kėdainiai district municipality, in Kaunas County, central Lithuania. According to the 2011 census, the village has a population of 46 people.

At the beginning of the 20th century Kėboniai was an okolica.

Demography

References

Villages in Kaunas County
Kėdainiai District Municipality